The NUR E 75 is Pakistan's first locally produced electric car. The car has a peak power of 80kW or 108hp and a battery capacity of 35kWh covering 210km. Pakistan’s first electric car prototype, which has been dubbed NUR-E 75, was unveiled on 15 August 2022.

References

Electric car models
Cars of Pakistan
Cars introduced in 2022